Sneakers is a 1992 American thriller film directed by Phil Alden Robinson, written by Robinson, Walter Parkes, and Lawrence Lasker, and starring Robert Redford, Dan Aykroyd, Ben Kingsley, Mary McDonnell, River Phoenix, Sidney Poitier, and David Strathairn; the film was released by Universal Pictures.

Plot 

In 1969, students Martin Brice and Cosmo are computer hackers who use their skills to finance left wing organizations. When Martin leaves for a pizza, Cosmo gets arrested, forcing Martin to become a fugitive.

In present-day San Francisco, Martin, now called Martin Bishop, heads a security specialists team undertaking penetration testing. The team includes Donald Crease, a former CIA officer and family man; Darren "Mother" Roskow, a conspiracy theorist and electronics technician; Carl Arbogast, a young hacking genius; and Irwin "Whistler" Emery, a blind phone phreak.

After performing their services for a bank, Martin is approached by NSA officers Dick Gordon and Buddy Wallace. He is asked to recover a "black box" from mathematician Dr. Gunter Janek, developed under the name "Setec Astronomy" supposedly for the Russian government. Martin is hesitant but agrees when the agents reveal that they are aware of his true identity and offer to clear his past in exchange. With help from his former girlfriend, Liz, Martin and his team secure the box, which is disguised as a telephone answering machine. During their subsequent celebration party, Whistler, Mother, and Carl investigate the box, finding it capable of breaking the encryption of nearly every computer system. Martin works out that "Setec Astronomy" is an anagram of "too many secrets", and issues a lockdown until they can deliver the box the next day.

Martin hands the box to Gordon and Wallace but barely escapes being killed by them after Crease discovers that Janek was killed the night before. His friend, Gregor in the Russian consulate, confirms that the officers were rogue agents and that Janek was working for the NSA. Before Gregor can elaborate further, fake FBI agents kill him and kidnap Martin, taking him to a remote location where he is reunited with Cosmo, who Martin thought had died in prison. While imprisoned, Cosmo developed ties with organized crime, who recognized his talents and later installed him as their money launderer and paymaster. Cosmo plans to use Janek's box to destabilize the world economy and offers Martin the chance to join him. Martin refuses, whereupon Cosmo uses the box to break into the FBI's mainframe and connect Martin's current identity with his former name. Cosmo has Martin knocked out and taken back to the city.

Martin, now a fugitive from the law again, relocates his team to Liz's apartment. They contact NSA agent Abbott, who wants the box but cannot offer safety until it is in Martin's possession. Whistler analyzes the sounds that Martin heard during his kidnapping and can identify the geographic area where Martin was taken, a toy company acting as a front for Cosmo's operation. They research the building's security systems and identify Werner Brandes, an employee whose office is next to Cosmo's. They set Liz up on a fake computer date with Brandes to obtain his keycard and vocal recognition codes, which Martin and the other team members use to initiate the recovery of the box.

Brandes begins to suspect Liz during the date and brings her to Cosmo at his office. Nothing appears amiss, and Cosmo lets Liz go, but when she comments on this being a computer date, Cosmo recognizes Martin's handiwork, and locks down the facility. Martin is apprehended and Cosmo once again tries to convince him to join him. Martin refuses and instead turns over the box. The team escapes before Cosmo realizes that he is holding an empty duplicate.

Back at their own offices, Martin's team is surrounded by Abbott and his agents. After Martin points out how important the secrecy of the box is to the NSA, who could use it to spy on other agencies, Abbott agrees to clear Martin's record and grant the requests of the rest of his team. After Abbott and the agents leave with the box, Martin shows he has rendered the box useless by removing the main processor.

In a postscript, a news report describes the sudden bankruptcy of the Republican National Committee, and the simultaneous receipt of large anonymous donations to Amnesty International, Greenpeace, and the United Negro College Fund.

Cast

Production 
Lawrence Lasker and Walter F. Parkes first conceived the idea for Sneakers in 1981, while doing research for WarGames. In early drafts, the character of Liz was a bank employee, rather than Martin's ex-girlfriend. The role was changed because Lasker and Parkes believed that it took too long for her character to develop.

Once Robert Redford was attached to the picture, his name was used to recruit other members of the cast and crew, including the director Robinson, who had little initial interest in the project but had always wanted to work with Redford.

At one point during the project, Robinson received a visit from men claiming to be representatives of the Office of Naval Intelligence, who indicated that for reasons of national security, the film could not include any references to "a hand-held device that can decode codes". Robinson was highly concerned, as such a device was a key to the film's plot, but after consulting with a lawyer from the film studio he realized that the "visit" had been a prank instigated by a member of the cast, possibly Aykroyd or Redford.

"I can't remember having so much fun on a movie," Stephen Tobolowsky recalled in 2012 for a 20th-anniversary piece about the film for Slate. He had initially scoffed at the script based on its title alone, but his agent persuaded him to read it, and he reconsidered. Afterward, he told his agent, "Now I know what a hundred million dollars at the box office reads like." "It was one of the most spectacular casts I've ever been lucky enough to be a part of," Tobolowsky wrote. When he was shooting the scene where he and McDonnell eat at a Chinese restaurant, Robinson told him he could do anything he wanted to make her laugh. "Dangerous words. It set the tone for the rest of the shoot," he recalls. "I played with my food. I made up lines (including one about pounding chicken breasts in the kitchen during our second date)." The rest of the cast and crew felt similarly. Near the end of the shoot, Robinson said the only way it could have been better would have been if the lab lost the film, so they would have had to do it all over again.

Leonard Adleman was  the mathematical consultant on this movie.

Release 
The film's press kit was accompanied by a floppy disk containing a custom program explaining the movie. Parts of the program were quasi-encrypted, requiring the user to enter an easily guessable password to proceed. It was one of the first electronic press kits by a film studio.

Reception 
The film received positive reviews from critics upon its release. Writing for the Los Angeles Times, Kenneth Turan called Sneakers "[a] caper movie with a most pleasant sense of humor," a "twisting plot," and a "witty, hang-loose tone." Turan went on to praise the ensemble cast and director Robinson, who is "surprisingly adept at creating tension at appropriate moments" and "makes good use of the script's air of clever cheerfulness". Roger Ebert, writing for the Chicago Sun-Times, was less impressed, giving the film two-and-a-half stars out of four, calling it "a sometimes entertaining movie, but thin." He went on to point out numerous cliches and tired plot devices recycled in the film. Vincent Canby, in a negative review for The New York Times, said the film looked like it had "just surfaced after being buried alive for 20 years," calling it "an atrophied version of a kind of caper movie that was so beloved in the early 1970's". He singled out Redford and Poitier as looking and acting too old to be in this kind of film now. He calls the plot "feeble," resulting in a film that is "jokey without being funny, breathless without creating suspense". He calls the ensemble an "all-star gang," but says the "performances are generally quite bad."

On Rotten Tomatoes the film has an approval rating of 80% based on reviews from 55 critics. The website's consensus states: "There isn't much to Sneakers plot and that's more than made up for with the film's breezy panache and hi-tech lingo."
On Metacritic the film has a score of 65 out of 100 based on reviews from 20 critics, indicating "generally favorable reviews".
Audiences surveyed by CinemaScore gave the film a grade A− on scale of A to F.

The film was a box office success, grossing over $105.2 million worldwide.

Novelization 
A novelization of the film written by Dewey Gram was published in English (Signet, 1992) and translated into German (Droemer Knaur, 1993).

TV series
In October 2016, NBC was developing a TV series based on the film. Writer Walter Parkes was brought on as an executive producer.

See also 
 List of films featuring surveillance

References

External links 

 
 
 
 
 Leonard Adleman's recollections of Sneakers

1990s heist films
1990s crime comedy films
1992 comedy films
1992 films
American comedy thriller films
American crime comedy films
American heist films
Cryptography in fiction
Films about computer hacking
Films about computing
Films about mathematics
Films about security and surveillance
Films about the National Security Agency
Films directed by Phil Alden Robinson
Films produced by Walter F. Parkes
Films scored by James Horner
Films set in 1969
Films set in the San Francisco Bay Area
Films with screenplays by Walter F. Parkes
Universal Pictures films
Works about computer hacking
Techno-thriller films
1990s English-language films
1990s American films